= Sebastiano Turbiglio =

Sebastiano Turbiglio (1842-1901) was an Italian philosopher, professor of philosophy at the University of Rome.

== Works ==
- Benedetto Spinoza e le trasformazioni del suo pensiero, 1874
- Le antitesi tra il medioevo e l'eta` moderna nella storia della filosofia, in especie nella dottrina morale di Malebranche, 1877
- Analisi storico-critica della Critica della ragion pura; otto lezioni, estratte dal corso di storia della filosofia, 1881
- L'universita` di stato e le universita` autonome, 1888
